Ingleburn was an electoral district of the Legislative Assembly in the Australian state of New South Wales, created in 1981, and named after and including the Sydney suburb of Ingleburn. It was abolished in 1988 and largely replaced by Macquarie Fields.

Members for Ingleburn

Election results

Elections in the 1980s

1984

1981

References

Ingleburn
Constituencies established in 1981
Electoral District Of Ingleburn
Constituencies disestablished in 1988
Electoral District Of Ingleburn